The 2018 NCAA Division I women's soccer season was the 37th season of NCAA women's college soccer.  The Stanford Cardinal were defending national champions.

Preseason

Coaching changes

Conference realignment
Six schools joined new conferences this season.  Four moved their entire athletic programs to new conferences, two NCAA Division II members that sponsor women's soccer announced during the 2016–17 offseason that they would upgrade their athletic programs to Division I effective in 2018, and one began play in its current all-sports league.  One conference announced that it would no longer use divisions for its women's soccer seasonal competition.

The Mid-American Conference previously divided its teams into an East and West Division.  However, in 2018 the league discontinued this and all teams were considered to be in one division.

Season Overview

Polls

Pre-season polls

Major upsets

Award winners

Players of the Week

Conference winners and tournaments

Conference standings

References 

 
NCAA, Women